Blues for Elvis – King Does the King's Things is the fifth studio album by Albert King. The songs in the album are versions of songs previously recorded by Elvis Presley. On the album sleeve there is a review by Albert Goldman, music critic for Life, who says, among other things: "For the first time on record, the King of Blues is meeting the King of Rock ... you're gonna love every minute of this musical feast fit for kings."

Track listing
"Hound Dog" (Jerry Leiber, Mike Stoller) – 4:03
"That's All Right" (Arthur Crudup) – 4:08
"All Shook Up" (Otis Blackwell, Elvis Presley) – 2:29
"Jailhouse Rock" (Leiber, Stoller) – 3:36
"Heartbreak Hotel" (Mae Boren Axton, Thomas Durden, Presley) – 6:05
"Don't Be Cruel" (Blackwell, Presley) – 3:27
"One Night" (Dave Bartholomew, Pearl King, Anita Steiman) – 4:18
"Blue Suede Shoes" (Carl Perkins) – 3:16
"Love Me Tender" (Vera Matson, Presley) – 5:19

Personnel
 Albert King – electric guitar, vocals
 Marvell Thomas – piano, organ
 Donald Dunn – bass guitar and also producer and arranger, with Al Jackson Jr.
 James Alexander – bass guitar
 Willie Hall – drums
Technical
 Terry Manning – audio engineer
 Shirley Glaser – cover portrait
 Honeya Thompson – art direction

References

1970 albums
Albert King albums
Elvis Presley tribute albums
Stax Records albums
Albums produced by Al Jackson Jr.
Albums produced by Donald "Duck" Dunn